This is a list of notable current and former inmates at the United States Penitentiary, Leavenworth.

Bank robbers

Espionage

Fraudsters and corrupt officials

Gangsters

Political prisoners

Sports figures

Violent criminals

See also
Federal Bureau of Prisons
Incarceration in the United States
List of lists of people from Kansas
List of people from Leavenworth County, Kansas
List of U.S. federal prisons

Source notes

References

External links

A Byte Out of History - The Five-Decade Fugitive Chase FBI

Prisoners and detainees by prison
List Leavenworth